Big wave surfing is a discipline within surfing in which experienced surfers paddle into, or are towed into, waves which are at least 20 feet (6.2 m) high, on surf boards known as "guns" or towboards. Sizes of the board needed to successfully surf these waves vary by the size of the wave as well as the technique the surfer uses to reach the wave. A larger, longer board allows a rider to paddle fast enough to catch the wave and has the advantage of being more stable, but it also limits maneuverability and surfing speed.

In 1992, big wave surfers such as Buzzy Kerbox, Laird Hamilton and Darrick Doerner introduced a cross over sport called tow-in surfing. While many riders still participate in both sports, they remain very distinct activities. This type of surfing involves being towed into massive waves by jet ski, allowing for the speed needed to successfully ride. Tow-in surfing also revolutionized board size, allowing surfers to trade in their unwieldy 12 ft. boards in favor of light, 7 ft boards that allowed for more speed and easier maneuvrability in waves over 30 ft (10 meters). By the end of the 1990s, tow in surfing allowed surfers to ride waves exceeding 50 ft (15 meters).

Hazards of big wave surfing

In a big wave wipeout, a breaking wave can push surfers down 20 to 50 feet (6.2 m to 15.5 m) below the surface. Once they stop spinning around, they have to quickly regain their equilibrium and figure out which way is up. Surfers may have less than 20 seconds to get to the surface before the next wave hits them. Additionally, the water pressure at a depth of 20 to 50 feet can be strong enough to rupture one's eardrums. Strong currents and water action at those depths can also slam a surfer into a reef or the ocean floor, which can result in severe injuries or even death.

One of the greatest dangers is the risk of being held underwater by two or more consecutive waves. Surviving a triple hold-down is extremely difficult, and surfers must be prepared to cope with these situations.

A major issue argued between big-wave surfers is the necessity of the leash on the surfboard. In many instances, the leash can do more harm than good to a surfer, catching and holding them underwater and diminishing their opportunities to fight towards the surface. Other surfers, however, depend on the leash. Today, tow-in surfboards are equipped with foot holds (like those found on windsurfs) instead of leashes, in order to provide some security to the surfer without generating safety hazards whilst the surfer is underwater.

These hazards have killed several big-wave surfers. Some of the most notable are Mark Foo, who died surfing Mavericks on 23 December 1994; Donnie Solomon, who died exactly a year later at Waimea Bay; Todd Chesser, who died at Alligator Rock on the North Shore of Oahu on 14 February 1997; Peter Davi, who died at Ghost Trees on 4 December 2007; Sion Milosky, who died surfing Mavericks on 16 March 2011; and Kirk Passmore, who died at Alligator Rock on 12 November 2013.

Paddle-in surfing
On 18 January 2010
Danilo Couto and Marcio Freire became the first to surf Jaws Peahi paddling, surfing the wave to the left side. They did not have jetski support and used only their shorts and their surfboards. They were the only ones to surf Jaws paddling until 4 January 2012, when it was surfed to the right side for the first time.

On 4 January 2012, Greg Long, Ian Walsh, Kohl Christensen, Jeff Rowley, Dave Wassel, Shane Dorian, Mark Healey, Carlos Burle, Nate Fletcher, Garrett McNamara, Kai Barger, North Shore locals and other of the best big-wave surfers in the world invaded the Hawaiian Islands for a historic day of surfing. Surfers had to catch and survive the wave at Jaws Peahi, on the north shore of Maui, without the use of a jet ski.

Jeff Rowley made Australian history by being the first Australian to paddle into a 50-foot plus (15-metre) wave at Jaws Peahi, Hawaii, achieving his 'Charge for Charity' mission set for 2011, to raise money for Breast Cancer Australia.

On 30–31 January 2012, Jeff Rowley and a number of international big wave surfers including Greg Long, Shaun Walsh and Albee Layer spent two days paddle-surfing Jaws, on the Hawaiian island of Maui, as part of their ongoing big-wave paddle-in program at the deep-water reef, further cementing the new frontier of paddle-in surfing at Jaws.

On 12 March 2012, Jeff Rowley paddled into Mavericks Left, California, and became the first Australian to accomplish this task. Mavericks is traditionally known as a right-hander wave and Rowley pushed the boundaries of what was possible at the Mavericks left-hander, a task that wasn't without its challenges, requiring a vertical drop into the wave.

On 30 March 2012, Jeff Rowley was a finalist in the Billabong XXL Big Wave Awards 2011/2012, in the Ride of the Year category with his rides at Jaws Peahi in Maui, Hawaii on 30 January 2012, placing 4th place in the world of elite big wave surfers.

Big Wave Surfing Contest
The oldest and most prestigious big wave contest is The Eddie, named after Oahu north shore Hawai'ian lifeguard and surfer Eddie Aikau.  The competition window is between 1 December and the last day of February annually.

Another big wave surfing contest hosted by Red Bull is held at Jaws Peahi, with invitation of 21 of the best big wave surfers in the world. The waiting period for the contest is from 7 December to 15 March. Some of the known invitees to the contest include Jeff Rowley, Albee Layer, Greg Long, Shane Dorian, Kai Lenny, Ian Walsh.

From 1999 to 2016, Mavericks was a premier big wave contest.  The first year's results were first place, Darryl Virostko ("Flea"); second place, Richard Schmidt (surfer); third place, Ross Clarke-Jones; and fourth place, Peter Mel.  This contest was last held in 2016, and has been indefinitely cancelled by the World Surf League.

Beginning in 2014–5, the World Surf League (WSL) has sanctioned the Big Wave World Tour (BWWT).  On 28 February 2015, Makua Rothman became the first WSL BWWT Champion with 20,833 points outscoring the runner up, Gabriel Villaran of Peru, by almost 7,000 points.

On 11 November 2016, Paige Alms of Maui was crowned the first women's big wave surfing champion at Jaws on Maui during the Pe'ahi Women's Challenge which was part of the Women's Big Wave Tour #1 held 15 Oct – 11 November 2016, at Haiku, Hawaii. This was the first big wave surfing contest ever held for women. The results were in first place Paige Alms (Hawaii), second place Justine Dupont (France), third place Felicity Palmateer (Australia), and tied for fourth place Keala Kennelly (Hawaii), Emily Erickson (Hawaii), and Laura Enever (Australia).

Big Wave Surfing Awards
 
Since 2005, the world's best big wave surfers gather in "Surf City" Huntington Beach, California for the annual World Surf League (WSL) Big Wave Awards hosted by surfer Strider Wastlewski. The gala ceremony is currently held at the Pasea Hotel and Spa and nominated surfers are awarded for their greatest rides of the past year and the big wave community is celebrated.

The event raises the bar every year with $350,000 in prize money allotted across seven categories: 
"XXL Biggest Wave"
"Biggest Paddle Wave"
"Tube of the Year"
"Best Overall Performance"
"Women's Performance"
"Wipeout Award"
"Ride of the Year".

The seven winners are given top honors and a TAG Heuer watch for another WSL big wave season.

WSL Big Wave Championship Tour champions
WSL Big Wave Championship Tour champions

Notable big wave surfing spots

Australia 
No Toes, New South Wales, Australia
Dangerous Banks, Tasmania, Australia
Pedra Branca, Tasmania, Australia
Shipstern Bluff, Tasmania, Australia
Cow Bombie, Western Australia, Australia
Cyclops, Western Australia, Australia
Tombstones, Western Australia, Australia
The Right, Western Australia, Australia

United States (Mainland) 
Cortes Bank, California, United States
Ghost Trees, California, United States
Mavericks, California, United States
The Wedge, California, United States
Nelscott Reef, Oregon, USA

Pacific Islands 
Cloudbreak, Fiji
Jaws/Peahi, Hawaii, United States
Pipeline, Hawaii, United States
Sunset Beach, Hawaii, United States
Waimea Bay, Hawaii, United States
Teahupoo, Tahiti, France
the Holy Grail Oahu, Hawaii

Europe 
Cribbar, Newquay, Cornwall, England
Aileens, Cliffs of Moher, Co. Clare, Ireland
Mullaghmore, Ireland
Madeira, Portugal
Nazaré, Portugal
Punta Galea between Getxo and Sopela, Basque Country, Spain
Aizpurupe near Zarautz, Gipuzkoa, Basque Country, Spain
Belharra, Basque Country, France

Latin America 
Praia da Vila, Santa Catarina, Brazil
Praia do Cardoso, Santa Catarina, Brazil
El Buey, Arica, Chile
Punta de Lobos, Chile
Puerto Escondido, Mexico
Todos Santos, Baja, Mexico
Pico Alto, Punta Hermosa, Lima, Peru

Caribbean 
Tres Palmas, Puerto Rico

Africa 
Dungeons, Cape Town, South Africa

Notable big wave surfers

William Leak Cootamundra
Nathan Fletcher Hawaii 
Lucas "Chumbo" Chianca Brazil
Carlos Burle Brazil
Koby Abberton Australia
Eddie Aikau Hawaii
Grant "Twiggy" Baker South Africa
Ken Bradshaw Hawaii
Tom Carroll Australia
Jeff Clark USA
Ross Clarke-Jones Australia
Shane Dorian Hawaii
John John Florence Hawaii
Jérémy Florès France
Justine Dupont France
Mark Foo Singapore
Maya Gabeira Brazil
Laird Hamilton Hawaii
Malik Joyeux Tahiti, France
Dave Kalama Hawaii
Keala Kennelly Hawaii
Kai Lenny Hawaii
Greg Long USA
Mark Mathews Australia
Garrett McNamara Hawaii
Peter Mel USA
Jay Moriarity USA
Greg Noll USA
Jamie O'Brien Hawaii
Felicity Palmateer Australia
Mike Parsons USA
Bob Pike Australia
Makua Rothman Hawaii
Jeff Rowley Australia
Will Skudin New York
Buzzy Trent Hawaii
Mark Visser Australia
Rodrigo Koxa Brazil
Mike Stewart Hawaii
 Conor Maguire Ireland

Big wave surfing movies

Surf's Up 2: WaveMania (2017 sequel, fiction)
Distance between Dreams (2016)
Point Break (2015 remake, fiction)
View from a Blue Moon (2015)
MAD DOGS - The Conquest of Jaws (2015) 
Hawaiian: The Legend of Eddie Aikau (2013)
Storm Surfers 3D (2012)
Chasing Mavericks (2012, biographical drama film)
Fighting Fear (2011)
Waveriders (2008)
Pipeline (2007)
Surf's Up (2007, fiction)
Billabong Odyssey (2005)
Riding Giants (2004)
Step Into Liquid (2003)
Die Another Day (2002, fiction)
Strapped (2002)
Laird (2002)
In God's Hands (1998, fiction)
Point Break (1991, fiction)
Big Wednesday (1978)
Ride the Wild Surf (1964, fiction)
Surfing Hollow Days (1961)

See also
 Diving hazards and precautions
 "Eddie Would Go"

References
 Warshaw, Matt. Mavericks: the story of big-wave surfing, Chronicle Books, 
Warshaw, Matt. "The Encyclopedia of Surfing." (2003).

External links
 Wave Warrior  (pbs.org)
 A selection of the world's biggest surfing waves